Bradford Gowen (born November 11, 1946) has received national attention since winning first prize in the 1978 Kennedy Center/Rockefeller Foundation International Competition for Excellence in the Performance of American Music. He earned his bachelor's and master's degrees from the Eastman School of Music where he studied piano with Cecile Genhart and composition with Samuel Adler. He later studied piano with Leon Fleisher and with Dorothy Taubman.

After winning the American music prize, Mr. Gowen made his New York recital debut at Alice Tully Hall and recorded an album of American music for New World Records; in Spring 1998 this recording, Exultation, was re-released as a CD with additional, newly recorded pieces included. On Memorial Day 1980, he performed Aaron Copland's Piano Concerto with the National Symphony Orchestra under the baton of the composer; the next year he performed several more times with that orchestra under Mstislav Rostropovich and Maxim Shostakovich. In January 1985 he performed the world premiere of Samuel Adler's Concerto for Piano and Orchestra at the Kennedy Center. In 1998 he played at the MTNA national convention, and he performed and gave a masterclass in the 70th birthday celebration for Leon Fleisher at the University of Kansas. In 2000, he gave the world premiere of the Piano Sonata of Judith Lang Zaimont.

Mr. Gowen's numerous chamber music performances have included appearances at the Library of Congress Summer Chamber Festival. He has also appeared with cellist David Soyer, with the Kronos Quartet, and with the Guarneri Quartet. He has made many duo appearances with his wife, pianist Maribeth Gowen, including a 1997 Schubert bicentennial concert at the National Gallery of Art devoted to the composer's four-hand works.

He wrote for over twenty years for The Piano Quarterly and Piano & Keyboard, and he made a number of recordings for The Piano Quarterly. In 2002 he wrote a major series of three articles on twentieth-century American piano music for the London-based International Piano. Mr. Gowen has served as a judge for several international piano competitions, including the Kapell, the Gina Bachauer, and the Sydney, and he was a member of the Advisory Committee that created and ran the Seventeen Magazine/General Motors National Concerto Competition.

Since 1981 he has been on the faculty at the University of Maryland, where he was Chair of the Piano Division from 1990 to 1994; since 2004 and 2005 he has been on the faculties of the Levine School of Music (Washington, DC) and the Washington Conservatory of Music, respectively. He is one of the 48 pianists featured in Benjamin Saver's 1993 book The Most Wanted Piano Teachers in the USA.

References and external links 
University of Maryland School of Music

American classical pianists
American male classical pianists
Living people
1946 births
20th-century American pianists
21st-century classical pianists
20th-century American male musicians
21st-century American male musicians
21st-century American pianists